The 2021–22 Florida State Seminoles men's basketball team represented Florida State University during the 2021–22 NCAA Division I men's basketball season. The Seminoles were led by head coach Leonard Hamilton, in his 20th year, and played their home games at the Donald L. Tucker Center on the university's Tallahassee, Florida campus as members of the Atlantic Coast Conference.

The Seminoles finished the season 17–14 overall and 10–10 in ACC play to finish in eight place.  As the eighth seed in the ACC tournament, they lost to Syracuse in their Second Round matchup.  They were not invited to the NCAA tournament or the NIT.

Offseason

Departures

Incoming transfers

2021 recruiting class

Roster

Schedule and results

Source:
|-
!colspan=12 style=| Exhibition 

|-
!colspan=12 style=| Regular season

|-
!colspan=12 style=|ACC tournament

Rankings

*Coaches did not release a week 1 poll and the AP does not release a poll after the NCAA Tournament.

References

Florida State
Florida State Seminoles men's basketball seasons
Florida State Seminoles men's basketball
Florida State Seminoles men's basketball